Eunectes stirtoni is an extinct species of anaconda that lived during the Middle Miocene (Laventan) in the area of the present-day Tatacoa Desert. Fossils of the species have been found in the Honda Group at La Venta, Colombia. The validity of this species has been called into question.

See also 
 Eunectes beniensis
 Eunectes deschauenseei
 Green anaconda
 Yellow anaconda

References 

stirton
Miocene reptiles of South America
Laventan
Neogene Colombia
Fossils of Colombia
Honda Group, Colombia
Fossil taxa described in 1977
Taxa named by Robert Hoffstetter